Garry Point Park is a public coastal park in Richmond, British Columbia. It is located at the southwestern side of Richmond, near Steveston. The park is next to the Salish Sea, providing views of Vancouver Island and the Gulf Islands. The area was used as a location for filming of the Netflix series Midnight Mass.

Attractions
The park includes Kuno Garden, a Japanese style garden, which was established in 1989 by the local Japanese community in celebration of Gihei Kuno, the first Japanese immigrant from Wakayama, Japan. It was donated to the city as a part of the centennial project. The park includes beaches and open areas for activities, such as picnicking and kite flying.

Gallery

References

External links
 City of Richmond BC - Garry Point Park